Finding Fish is a 2001 autobiographical book by Antwone Fisher. Upon release, it became a New York Times Bestseller.

Plot 
Antwone Fisher was born in prison to an incarcerated mother and a father who had been shot by a girlfriend. After being placed in foster care, Fisher was treated brutally and blamed for his own misfortunes.  He was also sexually abused by a woman who often babysat him from around age 3 to 8. He then was sent to George Junior Republic. Eventually, he found his way into a stable job in the Navy.

Film 
Later in adulthood, Fisher became a security guard at Sony Pictures Studios, where his story inspired producer Todd Black to make a film, Antwone Fisher, based on his story.

Further reading
 

2001 non-fiction books
African-American autobiographies
Autobiographies adapted into films